Gola Gokarannath railway station is main railway station in Gola Gokarannath City. This station is one of the suburban railway stations in Lucknow NER Division. Its code is GK. It serves Gola Gokarannath city. The station consists of three platforms and goods siding. There are direct trains available for Mailani, Lakhimpur, Lucknow, Gonda, Barabanki, Balrampur, and Gorakhpur. More trains are expected in future for New Delhi, Jaipur, Haridwar, Pune, Mumbai, Kanpur, Jhansi and other major cities of India.

References

Railway stations in Lakhimpur Kheri district